Peter Farkaš (born 11 November 1982 in Zlaté Moravce) is a Slovak football defender who currently plays for FC ViOn.

References

External links
 FC ViOn profile 

1982 births
Living people
Slovak footballers
Association football defenders
FC ViOn Zlaté Moravce players
FK Dukla Banská Bystrica players
Slovak Super Liga players
People from Zlaté Moravce
Sportspeople from the Nitra Region